Itamar Shviro (or Shwiro,  ; born 17 June 1998) is an Israeli professional football player who plays for Israeli Premier League club Ironi Kiryat Shmona and the Israel national team.

Early life
Shviro was born and raised in kibbutz Shoval, Israel, to an Israeli family of Jewish descent.

International career
Shviro made his senior debut for the Israel national football team on 27 September 2022 in a friendly game against Malta. Shviro scored his first goal (90'+3') for the Israeli squad on November 17, 2022 in a 4-2 victory against Zambia in a home friendly match.

See also 
 List of Jewish footballers
 List of Jews in sports
 List of Israelis

References

External links
 
 

1998 births
Living people
Israeli Jews
Israeli footballers
People from Shoval
Footballers from Southern District (Israel)
Israel under-21 international footballers
Israel international footballers
Association football forwards
Hapoel Be'er Sheva F.C. players
Hapoel Rishon LeZion F.C. players
Hapoel Ironi Kiryat Shmona F.C. players
Israeli Premier League players
Liga Leumit players